Michael Fountain (born January 26, 1972) is a Canadian former professional ice hockey goaltender who played in the National Hockey League (NHL) with the Vancouver Canucks, Carolina Hurricanes, and Ottawa Senators. He also played several seasons in the American Hockey League (AHL), as well as in the Russian Superleague. Since retiring as a player, he currently is Assistant Coach for the Team Canada Para Hockey Team.

Playing career
Michael Fountain grew up in the small town of Gravenhurst, Ontario. As a 15-year-old Michael Fountain played Jr.C. hockey for the Hunstville Blair McCanns in 1988-89. He was named rookie of the year and made the All Star Team. Michael  Fountain was drafted in the 15th round of the 1989 OHL Draft by the S.S. Marie Greyhounds.

After being drafted by the Greyhounds, he was assigned to the Chatham Micmacs Jr.B. hockey club in 1989-90 where he was teammates with future NHL players Todd Warriner and Brian Wiseman. The Micmacs won the Western JR B Championship

Michael Fountain played two seasons of junior hockey in the Ontario Hockey League with the Oshawa Generals and was named to the OHL First All-Star team in 1992. He was also one of the netminders for Canada at that year's World Junior Championships. Following his junior success, Fountain was selected 45th overall in the 1992 NHL Entry Draft by the Vancouver Canucks.

Michael Fountain turned pro for the 1992–93 season, and was assigned to the Hamilton Canucks of the American Hockey League. He played for the Syracuse Crunch from 94-97 with a GA of 3.2. http://www.hockeydb.com/ihdb/stats/pdisplay.php?pid=1754   He established himself as one of the top goalies outside of the NHL with a standout 1993–94 campaign, during which he led the AHL with 70 appearances, 34 wins, and 4 shutouts, and was named to the league's Second All-Star Team.

However, cracking the NHL would be difficult for Michael Fountain. Just as it appeared he was ready to succeed Kay Whitmore as the backup to Kirk McLean with the Canucks, the team acquired highly rated Corey Hirsch, who passed  Michael Fountain on the depth chart and was promoted directly to the NHL. Michael Fountain proceeded to toil for two more seasons in the AHL without getting an NHL opportunity. He was finally able to make his NHL debut midway through the 1996–97 season, and did so in memorable style. He became the 19th goalie in NHL history to record a shutout in their first NHL game, doing so against the New Jersey Devils, and nearly scored a goal as well, sending the puck just a few feet wide of the empty net late in the game. He finished the year with a 2–2–0 record and a 3.43 GAA in 6 appearances.

Michael Fountain left Vancouver to sign as a free agent with the Carolina Hurricanes for the 1997–98. He signed with the Ottawa Senators in 1999 and spent two seasons with the organization as their third goaltender, appearing in one NHL game in both years while performing well in the IHL and setting standards no Griffins goalie has attained since. He was named an IHL All Star in 2000/2001 season.

In 2001,  Michael Fountain left North America to sign in the Russian Super League with HC Lada Togliatti and led the RHL in GAA in his first season. He also set the all time Russian shutout record with 14 shutouts in 43 starts. After two years in Russia, he signed in Germany for 2003–04 with the Iserlohn Roosters. He returned to Russia in 2005, playing for Traktor Chelyabinsk, where he won the Russian Championship and was named MVP before re-joining Lada Togliatti in 2006.

Michael Fountain has appeared in 11 NHL games, posting a 2–6–0 record with a 3.47 GAA.

Career statistics

Regular season and playoffs

External links

References

1972 births
Beast of New Haven players
Canadian ice hockey goaltenders
Carolina Hurricanes players
Grand Rapids Griffins players
Hamilton Canucks players
HC Lada Togliatti players
Iserlohn Roosters players
Living people
Motor City Mechanics players
Oshawa Generals players
Ottawa Senators players
People from Gravenhurst, Ontario
Sault Ste. Marie Greyhounds players
Sportspeople from North York
Ice hockey people from Toronto
Syracuse Crunch players
Vancouver Canucks draft picks
Vancouver Canucks players
Canadian expatriate ice hockey players in Germany
Canadian expatriate ice hockey players in Russia